Retraining of Racehorses (RoR) is a national animal welfare organization in the United Kingdom. It was established by the British Horseracing Authority in 2000 and is a registered charity under English and Scottish law. RoR is the official charity for the welfare of horses who have retired from racing through injury, old age or a lack of ability. It is based at Palace House in Newmarket.

Activity
RoR performs the following actions:
 Raises money to support the retraining and rehoming of former racehorses
 Provides facilities for the care, retraining and rehoming of former racehorses
 Raises the profile of racehorses to other equestrian activities
 Operates education programmes to ensure handlers are adequately trained to care for the horses

RoR facilitates revenue grants and funds centre improvements and property purchases for four retraining centres:
 Greatwood Caring for Retired Racehorses
 HEROS (Homing Ex-racehorses Organisation Scheme)
 Moorcroft Racehorse Welfare Centre
 Thoroughbred Rehabilitation Centre
 Darley Stud Management

In 2009, Princess Haya became RoR's first Patron. Other patrons include Frankie Dettori, Clare Balding and Richard Johnson.

Notable horses
Among the horses helped by the charity are the Champion Hurdler Make A Stand and the Grand National winners Royal Athlete and Bindaree.

One graduate of the scheme is Summon Up Theblood who represented Brazil in the Three-day Event at the 2016 Summer Olympics.

References

External links

United Kingdom
United Kingdom
Animal charities based in the United Kingdom
2000 establishments in the United Kingdom